Events from the year 1993 in Belarus

Incumbents
 President: not yet established
 Chairman of the Supreme Soviet of the Republic of Belarus: Stanislav Shushkevich

Events
December 30: The new Beer Lovers Party, formed in August, is officially registered, with Andrey Romashevsky as its Chairman.

Births
March 5: Anna Orlik, tennis player

Deaths
September 28: Galina Makarova, actress (born 1919)

See also
 Years in Belarus

References

 
Years of the 20th century in Belarus